Ę (minuscule: ę; , "e with a little tail"; , "nasal e") is a letter in the Polish, Lithuanian and Dalecarlian alphabets. It is also used in Navajo to represent the nasal vowel  and Kensiu to represent the near-close near-front unrounded vowel . In Latin, Irish, and Old Norse palaeography, it is known as e caudata ('tailed e').

Polish

In the Polish alphabet, ę comes after e. It never appears word-initially, except for the onomatopoeia ęsi. It does not have one determined pronunciation and instead, its pronunciation is dependent on the sounds it is followed by.

Pronunciation 

That nonstandard form is used by the former Polish president Lech Wałęsa. Some of his sentences that were respelled to reflect the pronunciation, e.g., '' (properly written ''; 'I don't want to, but I have to') have entered popular language.

History

In Old Polish, nasal vowels were either not indicated at all or indicated with digraphs including a nasal consonant; Ø was also used. During the first decades after the introduction of movable type to Poland (exclusively blackletter at the time) a need to standardize orthography developed, and in the early 16th century Stanisław Zaborowski, inspired by Old Czech orthography reform by Jan Hus, analyzed Polish phonology and in Orthographia seu modus recte scribendi et legendi Polonicum idioma quam utilissimus proposed to add diacritics to Polish, including to mark nasal vowels with strokes. In particular, he proposed to write the nasal e sound as a with semivirgula superior (the letter was used to spell the phoneme traditionally because it was the original medieval pronunciation, see below), which printers of the time found not very convenient, and instead, Hieronymus Vietor crossed the lower part of an e. Later, when Polish printers began to use antiqua in the late 16th-century, Jan Januszowski took E caudata from Latin lettercase so as not to cast a new letter.

Polish ę sound evolved from the short nasal a of medieval Polish, which developed into a short nasal e in the modern language. The medieval vowel, along with its long counterpart, evolved in turn from the merged nasal *ę and *ǫ of Late Proto-Slavic:

Alternations
Ę often alternates with ą:
 'husband':  →  ('husbands'),
'error':  →  ('errors'),
'pigeon':  →  ('pigeons')
 'oak' in nominative:  →  (instrumental)
 'hands' in nominative:  →  (genitive)
 'five':  →  ('fifth')

Lithuanian 
In Lithuanian, the ogonek, called the nosinė (literally, "nasal") mark, originally indicated vowel nasalization, but around the late 17th century, nasal vowels gradually evolved into the corresponding long non-nasal vowels in most dialects.

The ogonek also helps to distinguish different grammatical forms which otherwise have the same written form but are pronounced differently. It is also used to change past tense verb to the participle in the past, e.g.,  to  – somebody who has pulled. 

Finally, some verbs have the letter in the middle of the word only in the present tense, e.g.,  ( is going off) but not  (went off).

Unlike with į or ą, no Lithuanian word is known to start with ę.

Computer use

See also
 Ą
 Polish phonology
 Polish alphabet
 Lithuanian orthography
 Ogonek
 Yus

References 

Lithuanian language
Polish letters with diacritics
E-ogonek